This is a listing of the horses that finished in either first, second, or third place and the number of starters in the Twixt Stakes, an American stakes race for fillies three years-old at 1 mile (8 furlongs) on the turf held at Laurel Park Racecourse in Laurel, Maryland.  (List 1974-present)

References

External links
 Laurel Park website

Laurel Park Racecourse